Warcraft  (alternatively known as Warcraft: The Beginning) is a 2016 action fantasy film based on the video game series of the same name. Directed by Duncan Jones and written by Charles Leavitt and Jones, it stars Travis Fimmel, Paula Patton, Ben Foster, Dominic Cooper, Toby Kebbell, Ben Schnetzer, Robert Kazinsky, and Daniel Wu. The film follows Anduin Lothar of Stormwind and Durotan of the Frostwolf clan as heroes set on opposite sides of a growing war, as the warlock Gul'dan leads the Horde to invade Azeroth using a magic portal. Together, a few human heroes and dissenting Orcs must attempt to stop the true evil behind this war and restore peace.

The film was first announced in 2006 as a project partnership between Legendary Pictures and the game's developer, Blizzard Entertainment. Warcraft premiered in Paris on May 24, 2016, and was released by Universal Pictures in the United States on June 10, 2016. The film underperformed domestically with a box-office total of $47.4 million in the United States and received generally negative reviews from critics. However, the film managed to gross $439 million worldwide based on its considerable success in China, where it grossed $225.5 million, making it the highest-grossing video game adaptation of all time (although it still failed to reach its break-even point of $500 million after global marketing and distribution costs).

Plot
Draenor, homeworld to the orcs, is being torn apart by a mysterious force known as fel magic. Gul'dan, an orc warlock, unites the orc clans into the Horde, and creates a portal to the world of Azeroth by using fel magic to drain the life out of captive draenei. Gul'dan leads a small warband through the portal to capture and sacrifice prisoners on Azeroth to bring the Horde. Durotan, the chieftain of the Frostwolf Clan, his pregnant mate Draka, and his friend Orgrim Doomhammer join this initial warband. When the orcs arrive on Azeroth, Draka goes into labor, and Gul'dan rescues the dying baby, named Go'el, by draining the life out of a nearby deer to revive and infuse him with fel magic. The orcs raid several settlements throughout Azeroth. Anduin Lothar, commander of the human forces of Stormwind Kingdom, finds a trespassing mage named Khadgar investigating the bodies of the slain men, who explains that the bodies contained traces of fel magic. Stormwind's king, Llane Wrynn, sends them to the stronghold Karazhan to inform Medivh, the Guardian of Tirisfal, of the fel magic's presence on Azeroth.

Lothar, Khadgar, and Medivh join a scouting team following traces of fel magic, but are ambushed by orcs. Medivh uses a spell to kill the fel-corrupted orcs, leaving the Horde's warchief, Blackhand, to flee along with Durotan and Orgrim. The team takes a half-orc slave, Garona, as prisoner, but Llane releases her in exchange for loyalty to Stormwind. Garona leads the humans to spy on the orc camp, where they learn of Gul'dan's plan to bring the Horde to Azeroth. While studying a book found in Medivh's library, Khadgar realizes that Gul'dan had help from someone in Azeroth opening the portal. Despite Orgrim's objections, Durotan meets with Llane secretly to unite the Frostwolf Clan and the humans against Gul'dan, but the group is ambushed by Blackhand. Medivh forms a magical barrier to protect the humans' retreat, but Lothar's son Callan is separated from the group and killed by Blackhand. Medivh is weakened, and Garona and Khadgar take him back to Karazhan to recover. After noticing Medivh's eyes shine green, Khadgar realizes that he has been corrupted by fel magic and that he is the one who helped Gul'dan. At the orc camp, Blackhand purges the Frostwolf Clan. Orgrim helps Draka to escape, and she sends Go'el down a river in a basket, but is found and killed.

Durotan challenges Gul'dan to Mak'gora, a duel to the death for leadership of the orcs. During the fight, Gul'dan violates the honorable combat rules by draining the life out of Durotan with his magic, killing him and earning the disapproval of the orcs watching, and he empowers Blackhand with the same magic. Medivh, now in a half-demonic state, starts to open the portal to Draenor, and Gul'dan begins sacrificing the captured human villagers to allow the rest of the Horde to enter Azeroth. Llane leads the human army in an assault on the orc camp, while Lothar and Khadgar fight Medivh and destroy the demon that had begun to manifest on the outside. Medivh is mortally wounded, and uses the last of his strength to close the portal to Draenor and instead open a portal to Stormwind, allowing Llane to evacuate most of the freed prisoners. Medivh dies and the portal closes, leaving Llane, Garona, and a small number of human soldiers to fight the orcs. Llane secretly orders Garona to kill him, bringing her honor among the orcs and putting her in a position of power to bring peace between the two races. Garona reluctantly does so and is welcomed into the Horde by Gul'dan. Lothar arrives to retrieve King Llane's body, but is confronted by Blackhand, who challenges Lothar to Mak'gora, with Lothar defeating and killing him, avenging Callan's death. Against Gul'dan's demands, the orcs, bound by tradition, allow Lothar to depart with Llane's body.

During Llane's funeral, the leaders of the other human nations, along with the high elves and dwarves, proclaim an alliance against the orcs and support Lothar as the leader of the Alliance. Elsewhere, Orgrim takes one of Durotan's tusks to one day give to Go'el, and the basket containing Go'el is found by a human.

Cast

 Travis Fimmel as Anduin Lothar, the military commander of the human forces in Stormwind Kingdom. Steadfast and charismatic, Anduin is a knight who has sacrificed everything to keep the king and his people safe.
 Paula Patton as Garona, a strong-willed half-orc caught between the war of orcs and humans.
 Ben Foster as Medivh, the Guardian of Azeroth and a mysterious and reclusive protector who wields formidable magical power.
 Dominic Cooper as Llane Wrynn, the ruler of the Kingdom of Azeroth and a beacon of hope for his people in times of darkness, and Anduin's brother-in-law.
 Toby Kebbell as Durotan, noble orc chieftain of the Frostwolf Clan and the father of Go'el.  He fights to save his clan and the rest of the renegade orcs from Gul'dan and the destruction of their world. Kebbell also portrays the Archmage Antonidas, leader of the Kirin Tor, the mage council of Dalaran.
 Ben Schnetzer as Khadgar, a gifted young mage who was trained at a young age by the Kirin Tor to succeed Medivh as Guardian, but left and eventually found his place in the Stormwind Kingdom.
 Robert Kazinsky as Orgrim, Durotan's best friend and second-in-command of the Frostwolf Clan
 Clancy Brown as Blackhand, the fearsome orc chieftain of the Blackrock Clan and puppet of Gul'dan
 Daniel Wu as Gul'dan, a sinister orc warlock who is the founder and leader of the Horde. Wielding powerful fel magic and driven by his ravenous desire for power.
 Ruth Negga as Lady Taria, Queen-consort of Stormwind, King Llane's wife and Anduin's sister
 Anna Galvin as Draka, Durotan’s mate and the mother of Thrall
 Callum Keith Rennie as Moroes, the caretaker of Karazhan and Medivh’s assistant
 Burkely Duffield as Callan, Lothar’s son
 Ryan Robbins as Karos
 Dean Redman as Varis/caged Frostwolf

In addition, Terry Notary provides the voice and motion-capture for Grommash Hellscream, the orc chieftain of the Warsong Clan, though the part is listed in the credits as Peon. Notary also served as stunt coordinator and movement coach for the film, working with cast members Kebbell, Kazinsky, Brown, Wu and Galvin on their portrayals of the orcs, and with Foster on his portrayals of magic. Michael Adamthwaite appears as King Magni Bronzebeard, the dwarf ruler of Ironforge.

Glenn Close makes an uncredited appearance as Alodi, an ancient mage locked in an artifact within Dalaran, described as "the Guardian before there was a Guardian". In the comics, Alodi was the first Guardian of Tirisfal and a male half-elf, while the character in the film is closer to that of Aegwynn, Medivh's mother. Chris Metzen, who served as a co-producer and uncredited story writer for the film, and is the Senior Vice-President of Story and Franchise Development at Blizzard Entertainment and the voice of Thrall in the Warcraft franchise, makes an uncredited cameo appearance as a turbaned perfume vendor on the streets of Stormwind Kingdom.

Production

Development and pre-production
The project was officially announced in May 2006 with Blizzard initially wanting it to be set in the universe of the real-time strategy Warcraft: Orcs and Humans video game from 1994. This setting was later dropped because Blizzard decided that it would be too similar to The Lord of the Rings. Initially scheduled for a 2009 release, the film would not see a release in that year. By Comic-Con 2011, the film was announced to still only be in the development stage.

Uwe Boll made a bid to direct, but was turned away by Blizzard, who he claims to have said, "We will not sell the movie rights, not to you… especially not to you. Because it's such a big online game success, maybe a bad movie would destroy that ongoing income, what the company has with it." Sam Raimi was initially attached to direct, but was replaced by Duncan Jones in January 2013. Upon coming aboard, Jones immediately voiced his displeasure at the script, which he stated "was the stale fantasy trope of, humans are the good guys, monsters are the bad guys". With Blizzard's approval (who had also been looking to change the story), Jones altered the story so that "It's 50-50." Jones also faced personal struggles during filming, as his wife was diagnosed with breast cancer soon after Jones took over, and his father, David Bowie, died from cancer late in production. Jones thus summed up the challenge by telling The New York Times, "My film started and ended with cancer." At San Diego Comic-Con International in July 2013, a concept trailer was presented, featuring a battle between a human and an orc.

Paul Dano, Travis Fimmel, Anson Mount, and Anton Yelchin emerged as the frontrunners for the lead role, with Fimmel winning the role in October 2013. On December 4, 2013, the main cast of the film, consisting of Fimmel, Ben Foster, Paula Patton, Dominic Cooper, Toby Kebbell and Robert Kazinsky, was announced. Idina Menzel, Debbie Gibson, Julie Delpy, Alison Eastwood and Leighton Meester were also considered for the role of Garona Halforcen. On December 14, 2013, Universal added Daniel Wu and Clancy Brown to the cast. In early March 2014, newcomer Burkely Duffield joined the cast.

Filming
Principal photography began on January 13, 2014, and lasted for four months, finishing on May 23, 2014. Filming took place primarily in Vancouver, among other locations. Post-production lasted twenty months. Regarding the use of computer-generated imagery, Jones said, "It's a tool like any other. It can be done well and it can be done shit. The best CGI has you forgetting [that] it's CGI, and accepting the visual as whatever it is supposed to be—like props. No one has an issue with props in film, do they?" Cinematographer Simon Duggan stated the film had a long prep of about 12 weeks, in addition to the 18 weeks of shooting.

Music
Warcraft: Original Motion Picture Soundtrack is the soundtrack. This music was composed by Ramin Djawadi and released on June 10, 2016. Djawadi was hired by Jones and Legendary Pictures in October 2014. The vinyl version of the soundtrack was released on September 5, 2016.

Release

Theatrical
Warcraft was set to be released on December 18, 2015, but following the announcement of the coinciding release of Star Wars: The Force Awakens, the release was pushed back to the following year. The film premiered at the Le Grand Rex in Paris on May 24, 2016. It was released in the United Kingdom on May 30, 2016, in the United States on June 10, 2016 and in Australia on June 16, 2016.

Home media
Warcraft was released on digital download on September 13, 2016, and was released on Blu-ray, Ultra HD Blu-ray, Blu-ray 3D and DVD on September 27 in the United States and Canada. Select editions of the physical release include a digital copy of World of Warcraft along with digital bonus codes for other Blizzard games to tie-in with the film.

Reception

Box office
Warcraft grossed $47.4 million in the United States, and $391.7 million in other countries, for a worldwide total of $439 million. Given its $160 million production budget and additional $110 million spent on promotions, the film needed to earn $450–500 million in order to break-even. In July 2016, The Hollywood Reporter said the film lost the studio around $15 million, although noted several executives put the losses in the $30–40 million range. Worldwide, it is the highest-grossing film of all time based on a video game (breaking Prince of Persia: The Sands of Times record). It is the first video game film to cross $400 million in ticket sales globally, and was also only the second Hollywood release (after Terminator: Genisys) to earn $100 million in China without making $100 million in the United States.

In the United States and Canada, Warcraft opened on June 10, 2016, alongside The Conjuring 2 and Now You See Me 2, and was projected to gross around $25 million in its opening weekend. Variety reported that the film was generating only moderate interest among U.S. moviegoers, which could possibly hurt its box office performance stateside, with poor reviews and competition from the aforementioned films and Teenage Mutant Ninja Turtles: Out of the Shadows (released the week prior) also affecting its performance. The film grossed $3.1 million from 2,632 theaters in its Thursday night previews and $10.7 million on its first day. It went on to gross $24.2 million, finishing second at the box office behind The Conjuring 2 ($40.1 million). It fell by 70% on its second weekend, earning $7.2 million.

Critical response
The website's critical consensus reads, "Warcraft has visual thrills to spare, but they – and director Duncan Jones' distinctive gifts – are wasted on a sluggish and derivative adaptation of a bestselling game with little evident cinematic value." On Metacritic, the film has a score of 32 out of 100 based on 40 critics, indicating "generally unfavorable reviews". Audiences polled by CinemaScore gave the film an average grade of "B+" on an A+ to F scale.

Geoff Berkshire of Variety criticized the film's attempts at adapting a source material with "inherent ridiculousness" with regard to how the original game series was not meant to have a very deep narrative: "[I]t's an unwaveringly earnest film that never owns up to exactly how campy every character, every conflict and every new realm truly is."  A.A. Dowd of The A.V. Club wrote that, "To watch Warcraft is never to be transported, but to wade through a thick morass of mythology, exposition, gaudy light-show effects, half-assed character development, and formulaic franchise groundwork," while describing director/cowriter Duncan Jones as "a talented sci-fi fabulist who’s fallen screaming into the same CGI abyss that consumed Peter Jackson during his unfortunate Hobbit cycle." Helen O'Hara, reviewing for British GQ, stated that although the film itself is a "strong adaptation" of Warcraft, the script diminishes the film's impact: "The problem is that it just can't escape those cod-fantasy roots. There are too many mysterious proper nouns being thrown into conversation and at least 12 major characters competing for space … [W]e're zipping from one to another here so quickly that they only have time for the most portentous, and sometimes clichéd, dialogue."

Sheri Linden of The Hollywood Reporter gave the film a positive review, citing the performances and story as highlights. Brian Truitt of USA Today also praised the acting, particularly Kebbell's performance as Durotan. "Kebbell's performance showcases the nuances of a father gripped by the no-win situation of having no home and his family in constant danger." Truitt also stated that he found it was not necessary for viewers of the film to have prior knowledge of the Warcraft series to enjoy the film.

Accolades

Future
With the film's storyline leaving Warcraft open to possible sequels, Jones has expressed interest in a sequel to the film, likely to be adapted from Warcraft II: Tides of Darkness, the second video game in the Warcraft franchise. On June 18, 2018, Jones tweeted that the chance of Warcraft getting a sequel "doesn't look good". In September 2020, it was reported that Legendary is developing a new Warcraft movie, though it's unknown if it is planned as a reboot or a sequel to Jones' film and will continue to be distributed by Universal Pictures or transferred to Legendary's current release partners Sony Pictures or Netflix.

See also
 List of films based on video games

References

External links

 
 Warcraft at Legendary Entertainment
 Warcraft at Universal Pictures
 
 
 

2016 action films
2010s fantasy adventure films
2016 3D films
2016 films
American action adventure films
American 3D films
American fantasy adventure films
American fantasy films
Atlas Entertainment films
Films scored by Ramin Djawadi
Live-action films based on video games
Films directed by Duncan Jones
Films produced by Thomas Tull
Films set on fictional planets
High fantasy films
IMAX films
Legendary Pictures films
Films using motion capture
Universal Pictures films
Warcraft
Works based on Blizzard video games
Films shot in Vancouver
Tencent Pictures films
2010s English-language films
2010s American films